Hwanseon Cave (환선굴) is a cave located in Gangwon province, South Korea.

Description 
In 1966 the South Korea government designated this cave and a neighboring cave not open to the public, Gwaneum cave (관음굴), National Monument 178. Hwanseongul was opened to the public in 1997.

The walls spout water from innumerable cracks and seeps, which join to make good-sized streams, waterfalls and ten large pools. The usual fanciful names have been given to the various formations, but the high rate of water flow has prevented the building up of many stalagmites or stalactites. Flowstones, rimstones, popcorn, pipes and curtains are more abundant. 47 species of wildlife have been recorded in the cave, including the lungless Korean clawed salamander Onychodactylus fischeri, the spider Allomengea coreana, the cave cricket Diestrammena asynamora, the millipedes Epanerchodus kimi and Antrokoreana gracilipes, the moth Apopestes indica, and a species of amphipod in the genus Pseudocrangonyx. Four species are unique to Hwanseon Cave, including the beetle Kurasawatrechus latior.

References

External links
 Visit Korea profile 

Caves of South Korea
Show caves in South Korea
Landforms of Gangwon Province, South Korea
Tourist attractions in Gangwon Province, South Korea